Ngô Đình Diệm ( or ; ; 3 January 1901 – 2 November 1963) was a South Vietnamese politician who was the final prime minister of the State of Vietnam (1954–1955), and then served as the first president of South Vietnam (Republic of Vietnam) from 1955 until he was captured and assassinated during the 1963 South Vietnamese coup.

He was born into a prominent family, a member of the Catholic Church in Vietnam and the son of a high-ranking civil servant, Ngô Đình Khả. He was educated at French-speaking schools and considered following his brother Ngô Đình Thục into the priesthood, but eventually chose to pursue a civil-service career. He progressed rapidly in the court of Emperor Bảo Đại, becoming governor of Bình Thuận Province in 1929 and interior minister in 1933. However, he resigned the latter position after three months and publicly denounced the emperor as a tool of France. Diệm came to support Vietnamese nationalism, promoting both anti-communism, in opposition to Hồ Chí Minh, and decolonization, in opposition to Bảo Đại. He established the Can Lao Party to support his political doctrine of Person Dignity Theory.

After several years in exile, Diệm returned home in July 1954 and was appointed prime minister by Bảo Đại. The 1954 Geneva Conference took place soon after he took office, formally partitioning Vietnam along the 17th parallel. Diệm soon consolidated power in South Vietnam, aided by his brother Ngô Đình Nhu. After the rigged 1955 State of Vietnam referendum, he proclaimed the creation of the Republic of Vietnam, with himself as president. His government was supported by other anti-communist countries, most notably the United States. Diệm pursued a series of nation-building projects, promoting industrial and rural development. From 1957, he was faced with a communist insurgency backed by North Vietnam, eventually formally organized under the banner of the Viet Cong. He was subject to several assassination and coup attempts, and in 1962 established the Strategic Hamlet Program as the cornerstone of his counterinsurgency effort.

In 1963, Diệm's favoritism towards Catholics and persecution of practitioners of Buddhism in Vietnam led to the Buddhist crisis. The violence damaged relations with the United States and other previously sympathetic countries, and his regime lost favour with the leadership of the Army of the Republic of Vietnam. On 1 November 1963, the country's leading generals launched a coup d'état with assistance from the Central Intelligence Agency. He and his younger brother, Nhu, initially escaped, but were recaptured the following day and assassinated on the orders of Dương Văn Minh, who succeeded him as president.

Diệm has been a controversial historical figure. Some historians have considered him a tool of the United States, while others portrayed him as an avatar of Vietnamese tradition. At the time of his assassination, he was widely considered to be a corrupt dictator.

Family and early life
Ngô Đình Diệm was born in 1901 in Quảng Bình province, in central Vietnam. His family originated in Phú Cam Village, a Catholic village adjacent to Huế. His ancestors had been among Vietnam's earliest Catholic converts in the 17th century. Diệm was given a saint's name at birth, Gioan Baotixita (a Vietnamized form of John the Baptist), following the custom of the Catholic Church. The Ngô-Đình family suffered under the anti-Catholic persecutions of Emperors Minh Mạng and Tự Đức. In 1880, while Diệm's father, Ngô Đình Khả (1850–1925), was studying in British Malaya, an anti-Catholic riot led by Buddhist monks almost wiped out the Ngô-Đình clan. Over 100 of the Ngô clan were "burned alive in a church including Khả's father, brothers, and sisters."

Ngô Đình Khả was educated in a Catholic school in British Malaya, where he learned English and studied the European-style curriculum. He was a devout Catholic and scrapped plans to become a Roman Catholic priest in the late 1870s. He worked for the commander of the French armed forces as an interpreter and took part in campaigns against anti-colonial rebels in the mountains of Tonkin during 1880. He rose to become a high-ranking Mandarin, the first headmaster of the National Academy in Huế (founded in 1896) and a counselor to Emperor Thành Thái of French Indochina. He was appointed minister of the rites and chamberlain and keeper of the eunuchs. Despite his collaboration with the French colonizers, Khả was "motivated less by Francophilia than by certain reformist ambitions". Like Phan Chu Trinh, Khả believed that independence from France could be achieved only after changes in Vietnamese politics, society and culture had occurred. In 1907, after the ouster of emperor Thành Thái, Khả resigned his appointments, withdrew from the imperial court, and became a farmer in the countryside.

After the tragedy that had befallen his family, Khả decided to abandon study for the priesthood and married. After his first wife died childless, Khả remarried and, in a period of twenty-three years, had twelve children with his second wife, Phạm Thị Thân, of whom nine survived infancy – six sons and three daughters. These were Ngô Đình Khôi, Ngô Đình Thị Giao, Ngô Đình Thục, Ngô Đình Diệm, Ngô Đình Thị Hiệp, Ngô Đình Thị Hoàng, Ngô Đình Nhu, Ngô Đình Cẩn and Ngô Đình Luyện. As a devout Roman Catholic, Khả took his entire family to daily morning Mass and encouraged his sons to study for the priesthood. Having learned both Latin and classical Chinese, Khả strove to make sure his children were well educated in both Christian scriptures and Confucian classics. During his childhood, Diệm laboured in the family's rice fields while studying at a French Catholic primary school (Pellerin School) in Huế, and later entered a private school started by his father, where he studied French, Latin, and classical Chinese. At the age of fifteen he briefly followed his elder brother, Ngô Đình Thục, who would become Vietnam's highest-ranking Catholic bishop, into seminary. Diệm swore himself to celibacy to prove his devotion to his faith, but found monastic life too rigorous and decided not to pursue a clerical career. According to Mark Moyar, Diệm's personality was too independent to adhere to the disciplines of the Church, while Jarvis recalls Ngô Đình Thục's ironic observation that the Church was "too worldly" for Diệm. Diệm also inherited his father's antagonism toward the French colonialists who occupied his country.

At the end of his secondary schooling at Lycée Quốc học, the French lycée in Huế, Diem's outstanding examination results elicited the offer of a scholarship to study in Paris. He declined and, in 1918, enrolled at the prestigious School of Public Administration and Law in Hanoi, a French school that prepared young Vietnamese to serve in the colonial administration. It was there that he had the only romantic relationship of his life, when he fell in love with one of his teacher's daughters. After she chose to persist with her religious vocation and entered a convent, he remained celibate for the rest of his life. Diệm's family background and education, especially Catholicism and Confucianism, had influences on his life and career, on his thinking on politics, society, and history. According to Miller, Diệm "displayed Christian piety in everything from his devotional practices to his habit of inserting references to the Bible into his speeches"; he also enjoyed showing off his knowledge of classical Chinese texts.

Early career 

After graduating at the top of his class in 1921, Diệm followed in the footsteps of his eldest brother, Ngô Đình Khôi, joining the civil service in Thừa Thiên as a junior official. Starting from the lowest rank of mandarin, Diệm steadily rose over the next decade. He first served at the royal library in Huế, and within one year was the district chief in both Thừa Thiên and nearby Quảng Trị province, presiding over seventy villages. Diệm was promoted to be a provincial chief (Tuần phủ) in Ninh Thuận at the age of 28, overseeing 300 villages.

During his career as a mandarin, Diệm was known for his workaholism and incorruptibility, and as a Catholic leader and nationalist. Catholic nationalism in Vietnam during the 1920s and 1930s facilitated Diệm's ascent in his bureaucratic career. Diệm's rise was also facilitated through Ngô Đình Khôi's marriage to the daughter of Nguyễn Hữu Bài (1863–1935), the Catholic head of the Council of Ministers at the Huế court and also supported the indigenization of the Vietnamese Church and more administrative powers to the monarchy. Nguyễn Hữu Bài was highly regarded among the French administration and Diệm's religious and family ties impressed him and he became Diệm's patron. The French were impressed by his work ethic but were irritated by his frequent calls to grant more autonomy to Vietnam. Diệm replied that he contemplated resigning but encouragement from the populace convinced him to persist. In 1925, he first encountered communists distributing propaganda while riding horseback through the region near Quảng Trị. Revolted by calls for violent socialist revolution contained in the propaganda leaflets, Diệm involved himself in anti-communist activities for the first time, printing his pamphlets.

In 1929, he was promoted to the governorship of Bình Thuận Province and was known for his work ethic. In 1930 and 1931, he helped the French suppress the first peasant revolts organized by the communists. According to Fall, Diệm put the revolution down because he thought it could not sweep out the French administration, but might threaten the leadership of the mandarins. In 1933, with the ascension of Bảo Đại to the throne, Diệm accepted Bảo Đại's invitation to be his interior minister following lobbying by Nguyễn Hữu Bài. Soon after his appointment, Diệm headed a commission to advise on potential administration reforms. After calling for the French administration to introduce a Vietnamese legislature and many other political reforms, he resigned after three months in office when his proposals were rejected. Diệm denounced Emperor Bảo Đại as "nothing but an instrument in the hands of the French administration," and renounced his decorations and titles from Bảo Đại. The French administration then threatened him with arrest and exile.

For the next decade, Diệm lived as a private citizen with his family in Huế, although he was kept under surveillance. He spent his time reading, meditating, attending church, gardening, hunting, and in amateur photography. Diệm also conducted extensive nationalist activities during those 21 years, engaging in meetings and correspondence with various leading Vietnamese revolutionaries, such as his friend, Phan Bội Châu, a Vietnamese anti-colonial activist, whom Diệm respected for his knowledge of Confucianism and argued that Confucianism's teachings could be applied to a modern Vietnam. With the start of the World War II in the Pacific, seeing an opportunity for Vietnam to challenge French colonization, he attempted to persuade the Japanese forces to declare independence for Vietnam in 1942 but was ignored. Diệm also tried to establish relationships with Japanese diplomats, army officers, and intelligence operatives who supported Vietnam's independence. In 1943, Diệm's Japanese friends helped him to contact Prince Cường Để, an anti-colonial activist, who was in exile in Japan. After contacting Cường Để, Diệm formed a secret political party, the Association for the Restoration of Great Vietnam (Việt Nam Đại Việt Phục Hưng Hội), which was dominated by his Catholic allies in Hue. When its existence was discovered in the summer of 1944, the French declared Diệm to be subversive and ordered his arrest. He flew to Saigon under Japanese military protection, staying there until the end of WWII.

In 1945, after the coup against French colonial rule, the Japanese offered Diệm the post of prime minister in the Empire of Vietnam under Bảo Đại, which they organized on leaving the country. He declined initially, but reconsidered his decision and attempted to reverse the refusal. However, Bảo Đại had already given the post to Trần Trọng Kim. In September 1945, after the Japanese withdrawal, Hồ Chí Minh proclaimed the Democratic Republic of Vietnam, and in the Northern half of Vietnam, his Việt Minh began fighting the French administration. Diệm attempted to travel to Huế to dissuade Bảo Đại from joining Hồ but was arrested by the Việt Minh along the way and exiled to a highland village near the border. He might have died of malaria, dysentery, and influenza had the local tribesmen not nursed him back to health. Six months later, he was taken to meet Hồ, who recognized Diệm's virtues and, wanting to extend the support for his new government, asked Diệm to be a minister of the interior. Diệm refused to join the Việt Minh, assailing Hồ for the murder of his brother Ngô Đình Khôi by Việt Minh cadres.

During the Indochina War, Diệm and other non-communist nationalists had to face a dilemma: they did not want to restore colonial rule and did not want to support the Việt Minh. Diệm proclaimed his neutrality and attempted to establish a Third Force movement that was both anti-colonialist and anti-communist In 1947, he became the founder and chief of the National Union Bloc (Khối Quốc Gia Liên Hiệp) and then folded it into the Vietnam National Rally (Việt Nam Quốc Gia Liên Hiệp), which united non-communist Vietnamese nationalists. He also established relationships with some leading Vietnamese anti-communists like Nguyễn Tôn Hoàn (1917–2001), a fellow Catholic and political activist. His other allies and advisors were dominated by Catholics, especially his family members and their friends.

Diệm also secretly maintained contact with high-ranking leaders of the Democratic Republic of Vietnam, attempting to convince them to leave Hồ Chí Minh's government and join him. At the same time, he lobbied French colonial officials for a "true independence" for Vietnam, Diệm was disappointed when in June 1948, Bảo Đại signed an agreement to grant Vietnam status as an "associated state" within the French Union, which allowed France to maintain its diplomatic, economic, and military policies in Vietnam. In the meantime, the French had created the State of Vietnam and Diệm refused Bảo Đại's offer to become the Prime Minister. On 16 June 1949, he then published a new manifesto in newspapers proclaiming a third force different from Vietminh and Bảo Đại, but it raised little interest and further, his statement provided evidence to both the French and Việt Minh that Diệm was a dangerous rival. In 1950, the Việt Minh lost patience and sentenced him to death in absentia, and the French refused to protect him. Hồ Chí Minh's cadres tried to assassinate him while he was traveling to visit his elder brother Thục, bishop of the Vĩnh Long diocese in the Mekong Delta. Recognizing his political status, Diệm decided to leave Vietnam in 1950.

According to Miller, during his early career, there were at least three ideologies that influenced Diệm's social and political views in the 1920s and 1930s. The first of these were Catholic nationalism, which Diệm inherited from his family's tradition, especially from Bishop Ngô Đình Thục, his brother, and Nguyễn Hữu Bài, who advised him to "return the seal" in 1933 to oppose French policies. The second was Diệm's understanding of Confucianism, especially through his friendship with Phan Bội Châu who argued that Confucianism's teachings could be applied to modern Vietnam. Lastly, instructed by Ngô Đình Nhu, Diệm began to examine Personalism, which originated from French Catholicism's philosophy and then applied this doctrine as the main ideology of his regime.

Exile
Diệm applied for permission to travel to Rome for the Holy Year celebrations at the Vatican. After gaining French permission, he left in August 1950 with his older brother, Bishop Ngô Đình Thục. Before going to Europe, Diệm went to Japan, where he met with Prince Cường Để, his former ally, and discussed Cường Để's efforts to return to Vietnam and his capacity to play some roles in his homeland. Diệm's friend also managed to organize a meeting between him and Wesley Fishel, an American political science professor at the University of California, who was working for the CIA in Japan. Fishel was a proponent of the anti-colonial, anti-communist third force doctrine in Asia and was impressed with Diệm and helped him organize connections in the United States. In 1951, Diệm flew to the United States to seek the support of government officials. Nevertheless, Diệm was not successful in winning US support for Vietnamese anti-communists.

In Rome, Diệm obtained an audience with Pope Pius XII at the Vatican before undertaking further lobbying across Europe. He also met with French and Vietnamese officials in Paris and sent a message indicating that he was willing to be the Prime Minister of the State of Vietnam to Bảo Đại. But Bảo Đại then refused to meet him. Diệm returned to the United States to continue building support among Americans. Nonetheless, to Americans, the fact that Diệm was an anti-communist was not enough to distinguish him from Bảo Đại and other State of Vietnam leaders. Some American officials worried that his devout Catholicism could hinder his ability to mobilize support in a predominantly non-Catholic country. Diệm recognized that concern and broadened his lobbying efforts to include a development focus in addition to anti-communism and religious factors. Diệm was motivated by the knowledge that the US was enthusiastic in applying their technology and knowledge to modernize postcolonial countries. With the help of Fishel, then at Michigan State University (MSU), Diệm was appointed as a consultant to MSU's Government Research Bureau. MSU was administering government-sponsored assistance programs for cold war allies, and Diệm helped Fishel to lay the foundation for a program later implemented in South Vietnam, the Michigan State University Vietnam Advisory Group.

The Americans' assessments of Diệm were varied. Some were unimpressed with him, some admired him. Diệm gained favor with some high-ranking officials, such as Supreme Court Justice William O. Douglas, Roman Catholic cardinal Francis Spellman, Representative Mike Mansfield of Montana, and Representative John F. Kennedy of Massachusetts along with numerous journalists, academics, and the former director of the Office of Strategic Services William J. Donovan. Although he did not succeed in winning official support from the US, his personal interactions with American political leaders promised the prospect of gaining more support in the future. Mansfield remembered after the luncheon with Diệm held on 8 May 1953, he felt that "if anyone could hold South Vietnam, it was somebody like Ngô Đình Diệm".

During Diệm's exile, his brothers Nhu, Cẩn, and Luyện played important roles in helping him build international and internal networks and support in different ways for his return to Vietnam. In the early 1950s, Nhu established the Cần Lao Party, which played a key role in helping Diệm attain and consolidate his power.

Becoming Prime Minister and consolidation of power
Until 1953, the State of Vietnam was nominally independent from Paris. Since dissatisfaction with France and Bảo Đại was rising among non-communist nationalists, and support from non-communist nationalists and Diệm's allies was rising for his "true independence" point of view, Diệm sensed that it was time for him to come to power in Vietnam.

In early 1954, Bảo Đại offered Diệm the position of Prime Minister in the new government in Vietnam. In May 1954, the French surrendered at Điện Biên Phủ and the Geneva Conference began in April 1954. On 16 June 1954, Diệm met with Bảo Đại in France and agreed to be the Prime Minister if Bảo Đại would give him military and civilian control. On 25 June 1954, Diệm returned from exile, arriving at Tân Sơn Nhứt airport in Saigon. On 7 July 1954, Diệm established his new government with a cabinet of 18 people.

In the first period of his premiership, Diệm did not have much power in the government; he lacked control of the military and police forces, and the civil system's key positions were still held by French officials. He also could not control the Bank of Indochina. Besides, Diệm had to face massive obstacles: refugee issues; the French colonists wanting to remove Diệm to protect France's interest in South Vietnam; General Nguyễn Văn Hinh, a Francophile, the leader of National Army was ready to oust Diệm; the leaders of the Hòa Hảo and Cao Đài sectarian armies wanted positions in Diệm's cabinet and complete administrative control over the areas in which they had large numbers of followers; and the major threat of Bình Xuyên, an organized crime syndicate that controlled the National Police led by Lê Văn Viễn, whose power was focused in Saigon. In summer 1954, the three organizations controlled approximately one-third of the territory and population of South Vietnam. In that situation, besides his own political skills, Diệm had to trust in his relatives and the backing of his American supporters to overcome the obstacles and neutralize his opponents.

Partition 

On 21 July 1954, the Geneva Accords temporarily partitioned Vietnam at the 17th parallel, pending elections in July 1956 to reunify the country. The Democratic Republic of Vietnam controlled the north, while the French-backed State of Vietnam controlled the south with Diệm as the Prime Minister. Diệm criticized the French for abandoning North Vietnam to the Communists at Geneva, claimed that the terms did not represent the will of the Vietnamese people, and refused French suggestions to include more pro-French officials in the government.

The Geneva Accords allowed for freedom of movement between the two zones until October 1954; this put a large strain on the south. Diệm had only expected 10,000 refugees, but by August, there were more than 200,000 waiting for evacuation from Hanoi and Hải Phòng. Nevertheless, the migration helped to strengthen Diệm's political base of support. To deal with the refugee situation, Diem's government arranged for their relocation into fertile and under-populated provinces in the western Mekong Delta. The Diệm regime also provided them with food and shelter, farm tools, and housing material. The government also dug irrigation canals, built dikes, and dredged swamp-lands to help stabilise their lives.

Establishing control 
In August 1954, Diệm also had to face the "Hinh crisis" when Nguyễn Văn Hinh launched a series of public attacks on Diệm, proclaiming that South Vietnam needed a "strong and popular" leader. Hinh also bragged that he was preparing a coup. However, at the end of 1954, Diệm successfully forced Hinh to resign from his post. Hinh had to flee to Paris and hand over his command of the national army to General Nguyễn Văn Vy. But the National Army officers favoured Diệm's leadership over General Vy, which forced him to flee to Paris. Despite the failure of Hinh's alleged coup, the French continued to encourage Diệm's enemies in an attempt to destabilize him.

On 31 December 1954, Diệm established the National Bank of Vietnam and replaced the Indochinese banknotes with new Vietnamese banknotes. In early 1955, although American advisors encouraged Diệm to negotiate with the leaders of the political-religious forces who threatened to overthrow his position and to forge an anti-communist bloc, he was determined to attack his enemies to consolidate his power. In April 1955, Diệm's army forces took most of Bình Xuyên's posts in Saigon after a victory in the Battle of Saigon. Within a few months, Diệm's troops wiped out the Bình Xuyên's remnants, leaving only a few small bands, who then joined forces with the communists. The failure of Bình Xuyên marked the end of French efforts to remove Diệm. After the defeat of Bình Xuyên, the authority and prestige of Diệm's government increased. Most of the Cao Đài leaders chose to rally to Diệm's government. Diệm then dismantled the private armies of the Cao Đài and Hòa Hảo religious sects. By the end of 1955, Diệm had almost taken control of South Vietnam, and his government was stronger than ever before. In April 1956, along with the capture of Ba Cụt, the leader of the last Hòa Hảo rebels, Diệm almost subdued all of his non-communist enemies, and could focus on his Vietnamese communist opponents. According to Miller, Diệm's capacity in subduing his enemies and consolidating his power strengthened US support of his government, although the US government had planned to withdraw its backing from Diệm during his early difficult years of leadership.

Presidency (1955–1963)

Establishment of the Republic of Vietnam

In South Vietnam, a referendum was scheduled for 23 October 1955 to determine the future direction of the south, in which the people would choose Diệm or Bảo Đại as the leader of South Vietnam. During the election, Diệm's brother Ngô Đình Nhu and the Cần Lao Party supplied Diệm's electoral base in organizing and supervising the elections, especially the propaganda campaign for destroying Bảo Đại's reputation. Supporters of Bảo Đại were not allowed to campaign, and were physically attacked by Nhu's workers. Official results showed 98.2 per cent of voters favoured Diệm, an implausibly high result that was condemned as fraudulent. The total number of votes far exceeded the number of registered voters by over 380,000, further evidence that the referendum was heavily rigged. For example, only 450,000 voters were registered in Saigon, but 605,025 were said to have voted for Diệm.

On 26 October 1955, Diệm proclaimed the formation of the Republic of Vietnam, with himself as its first President, although only until 26 October 1956. The first Constitution provided articles to establish the republic and organize the election of its president. The 1954 Geneva Accords prescribed elections to reunify the country in 1956. Diệm refused to hold these elections, claiming that a free election was not possible in the North and that since the previous State of Vietnam had not signed the accords, they were not bound by it – despite having been part of the French Union, which itself was bound by the Accords. According to Taylor, Diệm's rejection of the Geneva accords was a way of objecting to the French colonization of Vietnam. Diệm's disposition of Bảo Đại and the establishment of the First Republic of Vietnam was a way to claim Vietnamese independence from France. At the same time, the first Constitution of the Republic of Vietnam was promulgated. According to the Constitution, Diệm as president vested a huge amount of power, and his governance style became increasingly authoritarian over time.

Diệm's rule was authoritarian and nepotistic. His most trusted official was Nhu, leader of the primary pro-Diệm Can Lao political party, who was an opium addict and admirer of Adolf Hitler. He modeled the Can Lao secret police's marching style and torture styles on Nazi designs. Cẩn was put in charge of the former Imperial City of Huế. Although neither Cẩn or Nhu held any official role in the government, they ruled their regions of South Vietnam, commanding private armies and secret police. His youngest brother Luyện, was appointed Ambassador to the United Kingdom. His elder brother, Ngô Đình Thục, was Archbishop of Huế. Despite this, Thuc lived in the Presidential Palace, along with Nhu, Nhu's wife and Diệm. Diệm was nationalistic, devoutly Catholic, anti-Communist, and preferred the philosophies of personalism and Confucianism.

Diệm's rule was also pervaded by family corruption. Can was widely believed to be involved in illegal smuggling of rice to North Vietnam on the black market and opium throughout Asia via Laos, as well as monopolising the cinnamon trade, amassing a fortune stored in foreign banks. With Nhu, Can competed for U.S. contracts and rice trade. Thuc, the most powerful religious leader in the country, was allowed to solicit "voluntary contributions to the Church" from Saigon businessmen, which was likened to "tax notices". Thuc also used his position to acquire farms, businesses, urban real estate, rental property and rubber plantations for the Catholic Church. He also used Army of the Republic of Vietnam personnel to work on his timber and construction projects. The Nhus amassed a fortune by running numbers and lottery rackets, manipulating currency and extorting money from Saigon businesses. Luyen became a multimillionaire by speculating in piasters and pounds on the currency exchange using inside government information.

However, according to Miller, Diệm also clamped down on corruption. South Vietnam was divided into colonial era provinces, of which governors enjoyed sweeping powers and firmly controlled local administrations, creating a problem of corruption and cronyism. The governors were widely seen as petty tyrants, and Diệm launched corruption probes while also replacing many of the governors, but starting in 1954, the political turmoil prevented him from taking further measures. The MSUG, an American advisory body created to aid the Diệm's regime, recommended that Diệm centralizes power by abolishing local administrations and reforming the existing ones into much larger "areas", with much less power and no financial autonomy. Diệm objected to abolishing the position of province chiefs, arguing that only local governments could address "the needs of local people" and believed that requiring fiscal self-sufficiency from the local governments was key to creating the "ethos of mutual responsibility" – a key concept in Diệm's communitarian intrepretation of democracy.

The Can Lao Party played a key role in Diệm's regime. Initially, the party acted secretly based on a network of cells, and each member only knew the identities of a few other members. When necessary, the Party could assume the role of the government. After 1954, the existence of the party was recognized, but its activities were hidden from public view. In the early 1950s, Diệm and Nhu used the party to mobilize support for Diệm's political movements. According to the decree 116/BNV/CT of the Republic of Vietnam, the Can Lao Party was established on 2 September 1954. Personalism (Vietnamese: Chủ nghĩa nhân vị) officially became the basic doctrine of Diệm's regime since the Constitution's preface declared that "Building Politics, Economy, Society, Culture for the people based on respecting Personalism".

Elections 

According to Miller, democracy, to Diệm, was rooted in his dual identity as Confucian and Catholic, and was associated with communitarianism and the doctrine of Personalism. He defined democracy as "a social ethos based on certain sense of moral duty", not in the US sense of "political right" or political pluralism and in the context of an Asian country like Vietnam, Confucian and Catholic values were relevant to deal with contemporary problems in politics, governance, and social change. In this sense, Diệm was not a reactionary mandarin lacking an interest in democracy as he has been portrayed by some scholars. His way of thinking about democracy became a key factor of his approach to political and administrative reform. Diệm argued that post-colonial Vietnam must be a democratic country, but noted that Vietnamese democracy should develop out of its precolonial models, rather than European and American concepts, arguing that Vietnamese "institutions, customs and the principles underlying them are democratic facts." Researching the Nguyễn dynasty, Diệm asserted that the moral norm of Nguyễn-era Vietnam was that it was founded "on the people", following the Confucian concept of Mandate of Heaven; people could and often did withdraw their support from unpopular monarchs, causing their downfall. Diệm considered it an "indigenous Vietnamese democratic tradition" and wished to make it the basis of democracy that would emerge in Vietnam. Diệm's ideology of Personalism was largely influenced by the Confucian notion that self-improvement meant cooperation with one's local community and society at large; he thought that there is a tension between individual's personal ambitions and community's ethos of mutual responsibility. Inspired by the writings of Catholic philosopher Emmanuel Mounier, Diệm considered his ideology of Personalism a "third way" of communitarianism, presenting an alternative to both individualism and collectivism, insisting that democracy couldn't be realised "by drafting and promulgating documents and regulations", but that civil liberties granted by democratic regime to its citizens should serve "collective social improvement", serving each person's community rather than the individual itself. In 1955, Diệm wrote that "democracy is primarily a state of mind, a way of living that respects the human person, both with regard to ourselves and with regard to others" and that "more than any other form of government, democracy demands that we all display wisdom and virtue in our dealings with each other." In 1956, Diem added that democracy had to foster a feeling of community and mutual responsibility, arguing that respect for democracy lays in "decency in social relations", thus defining Vietnamese democracy as inherently communitarian and not individualist. 

In Summer and Fall of 1955, Diệm's administration had to decide the fate of Bảo Đại. Bảo Đại was initially supposed to remain the head of state until the National Assembly elections, but Diệm's cabinet decided to decide the monarch's fate through a referendum. Miller highlights that despite the popular belief that the referendum was put forward by Edward Lansdale, it was Diệm who decided to organise the referendum as a way to burnish his democratic credentials and attempt to realise his democratic ideas. While the monarch was highly unpopular given his collaboration with the French colonial regime, the new regime committed to further diminishing Đại's reputation with aggressive smear campaign and large pro-rallies, and the referendum itself was considered non-secret, given that the voters were given ballots with the photos of Diệm and Bảo Đại on it and were supposed to tear it in half and deposit the slice with their preferred candidate into the box – this made one's choice visible to everyone. Miller notes that the referendum reveals the eccentric nature of Diệm's understanding of democracy – in the sense of political pluralism, the vote appeared inherently authoritarian; but to Diệm his margin appeared legitimate, as he described democracy as "state of mind" in which the people elect the morally superior leader. Thus Diệm was "adamant that the outcome was entirely consistent with his view of democracy as the citizenry's embrace of a common moral ethos".

On 4 March 1956, the elections for the first National Assembly were held. Miller notes that these elections were considerably more free and fair than the referendum, and some governmental candidates would highly contest with independents and oppositionist candidates for their seats. On this occasion, non-government candidates were allowed to campaign and the election had an atmosphere of legitimate pluralism, but the government retained the right to ban candidates deemed to be linked to the communists or other 'rebel' groups, and campaign material was screened. However, Miller notes that in some districts the opposition candidates withdrew due to police intimidation and military presence. Surprisingly, instead of letting the draft constitution be created by a handpicked commission, Diệm dissolved it and had the constitution be made by the National Assembly deputies instead. The government hailed the process as democratic and transparent, given how the Assembly meetings were open and media presence was allowed; the National Revolutionary Movement dominated the council, but a handful of opposition figures have won seats as well.

However, Diệm's regime of "democratic one man rule" faced increasing difficulties. After coming under pressure from within Vietnam and from the United States, Diệm agreed to hold legislative elections in August 1959 for South Vietnam. But in reality, newspapers were not allowed to publish names of independent candidates or their policies, and political meetings exceeding five people were prohibited. Candidates who ran against government-supported opponents faced harassment and intimidation. In rural areas, candidates who ran were threatened using charges of conspiracy with the Việt Cộng, which carried the death penalty. Phan Quang Đán, the government's most prominent critic, was allowed to run. Despite the deployment of 8,000 ARVN plainclothes troops into his district to vote, Đán still won by a ratio of six to one. The busing of soldiers to vote for regime approved candidates occurred across the country. When the new assembly convened, Đán was arrested.

In May 1961, U.S. Vice President Lyndon B. Johnson visited Saigon and enthusiastically declared Diệm the "Winston Churchill of Asia". Asked why he had made the comment, Johnson replied, "Diệm's the only boy we got out there." Johnson assured Diệm of more aid in molding a fighting force that could resist the communists.

Socio-economic policies
During his presidency, Diệm imposed programs to reform Saigon society in accordance with Catholic and Confucian values. Brothels and opium dens were closed, divorce and abortion were made illegal, and adultery laws were strengthened. Additionally, Diệm's government established many schools and universities, such as the National Technical Center at Phú Thọ in 1957, the University of Saigon (1956), the University of Hue (1957), and the University of Dalat (1957).

Rural development
Diệm hoped to develop a national, revolutionary spirit within the citizens of South Vietnam as well as a vibrant communal democracy and an independent, non-communist Vietnam. He saw the peasantry as the key to this nation-building as he believed the peasantry was more likely to put the country before their own self interest in a spirit of volunteerism. A Special Commissariat for Civic Action was established to extend the reach of the Saigon government into rural areas and to help create 'model villages' to show rural peasants that the South Vietnamese government was viable as well as allowing citizen volunteers, and experts, to help these communities develop and tie them to the nation. The Special Commissariat for Civic Action was considered a practical tool of Diệm's government to serve "the power vacuum", and be a force of influence for Diệm's government, in the rural countryside following the departure of Việt Minh cadres after the Geneva Accords (1954).

Geoffrey C. Stewart's study provides a clearer picture of Diệm's domestic policies and a further understanding of his government's efforts in reaching and connecting with local communities in South Vietnam that shows "an indigenous initiative" of the government in building an independent and viable nation.

Land Reform: In South Vietnam, especially in Mekong Delta, landholdings in rural areas were concentrated in small number of rich landlord families. Thus, it was urgent to implement land reform in South Vietnam. Diệm had two attempts to control the excesses of the land tenancy system by promulgating the Ordinance 2 on 28 January 1955 to reduce land rent between 15% to 25% of the average harvest and the Ordinance 7 on 5 February 1955 to protect the rights of tenants on new and abandoned land and enhancing cultivation. In October 1956, with the urge from Wolf Ladejinsky, Diệm's personal adviser on agrarian reform, Diệm promulgated a more serious ordinance on the land reform, in which he proclaimed a "land to the tiller" (not to be confused with other Land reform in South Vietnam like Nguyễn Văn Thiệu's later 'Land to the Tiller" program) program to put a relatively high 100 hectares limit on rice land and 15 hectares for ancestral worship. However, this measure had no real effect because many landlords evaded the redistribution by transferring the property to the name of family members. Besides, during the 1946–54 war against the French Union forces, the Việt Minh had gained control of parts of southern Vietnam, initiated land reform, confiscated landlords' land and distributed it to the peasants. Additionally, the ceiling limit was more than 30 times that allowed in Japan, South Korea, and Taiwan, and the 370,000 acres (1,500 km2) of the Catholic Church's landownings in Vietnam were exempted. The political, social, and economic influences of the land reform was minimal. From 1957 to 1963, only 50 percent of expropriated land was redistributed, and only 100,000 out of approximately one million tenant farmers in South Vietnam benefited from the reform.

Resettlement: According to Miller, Diệm, who described tenant farmers as a "real proletariat" and pursued the goal of "middle peasantization", was not a beholden to large landowners, instead of vigorously implementing Land Reform, Diệm had his own vision in Vietnamese rural development based on resettlement, which focused on redistribution of people (rather than land), could reduce overpopulation and lead to many benefits in socio-economic transformation as well as military affairs and security, especially anti-communist infiltration. Moreover, Diệm was ambitious to envision Resettlement as a tactic to practice the government's ideological goals. The differences between the US and Diệm over nation building in countryside shaped the clashes in their alliance.

The Cái Sắn resettlement project: In late 1955, with the help of US material support and expertise, Diệm's government implemented the project Cái Sắn in An Giang province, which aimed to resettle one hundred thousand northern refugees.

Land Development program (Khu dinh điền): In early 1957, Diệm started a new program called the Land Development to relocate poor inhabitants, demobilized soldiers, and minority ethnic groups in central and southern Vietnam into abandoned or unused land in Mekong Delta and Central Highlands, and cultivating technological and scientific achievements to transform South Vietnam and ensure security and prevent communist infiltration. Diệm believed that the program would help improve civilians' lives, teach them the values of being self-reliant and hard working. At the end of 1963, the program had built more than two hundred settlements for a quarter of a million people. Nevertheless, the lacks of conditions in these areas along with the corruption and mercilessness of local officials failed the program.

Agroville program (khu trù mật): During late 1959 and early 1960, motivated by the idea of population regroupment, Diệm introduced the Agroville Program, which he intended to physically relocate residents who lived in remote and isolated regions in Mekong delta into new settlements in "dense and prosperous areas"—proposing to offer them urban modernity and amenities without leaving their farms, and to keep them far away from the communists. Nonetheless, by late 1960, Diệm had to admit that the program's objective failed since the residents were not happy with the program and the communists infiltrated it, and he had to discard it.

According to Miller, the disagreement between the US and Diệm over agrarian reform made their alliance "move steadily from bad to worse". Miller argues that Diệm expressed "genuine desire to end the exploitation and misery that afflicted millions of South Vietnamese rural residents", and wished to support poor peasantry by gradual modernisation and moderate redistribution of land. Diệm's ideal was rendering the Vietnamese countryside dominated by freeholding farmers with roughly equal position of wealth. Diệm wanted to acquire and distribute the land of rich landowners, but also wished to protect the property of middle-class ones. One of the main concerns of Diệm was overpopulation, aggravated by the mass migration of refugees from the North, something that Diệm wished to alleviate by resettlement. Diệm considered resettlement an important part of his economic nationalism, arguing that utilising Vietnamese land would increase the production of grains and rubber and allow South Vietnam to enter international trade. Ideologically, Diệm considered this policy a key to his "Personalist revolution" – the resettled villages would be "neither communist-style collectives nor incubators of rugged individualism", but they would rather conform to his ideal of communitarianism. Rendering landless peasants freeholders was seen as a step towards reforming the Vietnamese society as a whole. In late 1955, a Cai San Project was launched that aimed to settle northern refugees in rural areas previously occupied by Hòa Hảo partisans. This project created an intense social conflict between the settlers and Cai San natives, and Diệm offered a concession to the local landowers by decreeing that refugees must sign rental contracts with them. This sparked refugee demonstrations that only started to fade away when Diệm ordered that refugees have the right to buy out the land they worked at. While initially considered a failure, especially due to the fact that the resettlement sparked anti-government sentiment and created social conflicts, Miller notes that Cai San became fairly prosperous by 1960, and the settlement did gradually evolve into a pro-government stronghold, thus succeeding in its aim at counter-insurgency. Many of the counter-insurgency programs progressed too quickly however, and ended up destabilising the regime.

Counter-insurgency

During his presidency, Diệm strongly focused on his central concern: internal security to protect his regime as well as maintain order and social change: staunch anti-subversion and anti-rebellion policies. After the Bình Xuyên was defeated and the Hòa Hảo, Cao Đài were subdued, Diệm concentrated on his most serious threat: the communists. Diệm's main measures for internal security were threats, punishment and intimidation. His regime countered North Vietnamese and communist subversion (including the assassination of over 450 South Vietnamese officials in 1956) by detaining tens of thousands of suspected communists in "political re-education centers". The North Vietnamese government claimed that over 65,000 individuals were imprisoned and 2,148 killed in the process by November 1957. According to Gabriel Kolko, by the end of 1958, 40,000 political prisoners had been jailed.

By the end of 1959, Diệm was able to entirely control each family and the communists had to suffer their "darkest period" in their history. Membership declined by two thirds and they had almost no power in the countryside of South Vietnam. Diệm's repression extended beyond communists to anti-communist dissidents and anti-corruption whistleblowers. In 1956, after the "Anti-Communist Denunciation Campaign", Diệm issued Ordinance No. 6, which placed anyone who was considered a threat to the state and public order in jail or house arrest.

Nevertheless, Diệm's hard policies led to fear and resentment in many quarters in South Vietnam and negatively affected his relations with the US in terms of counter-insurgent methods. On 22 February 1957, when Diệm delivered a speech at an agricultural fair in Buôn Ma Thuột, a communist named Hà Minh Tri attempted to assassinate the president. He approached Diệm and fired a pistol from close range, but missed, hitting the Secretary for Agrarian Reform's left arm. The weapon jammed and security overpowered Tri before he was able to fire another shot. Diệm was unmoved by the incident. The assassination attempt was the desperate response of the communists to Diệm's relentless anti-communist policies.

As opposition to Diệm's rule in South Vietnam grew, a low-level insurgency began to take shape there in 1957. Finally, in January 1959, under pressure from southern Viet Cong cadres who were being successfully targeted by Diệm's secret police, Hanoi's Central Committee issued a secret resolution authorizing the use of armed insurgency in the South with supplies and troops from the North. On 20 December 1960, under instructions from Hanoi, southern communists established the Viet Cong (NLF) in order to overthrow the government of the south. On 11 November 1960, a failed coup attempt against President Ngô Đình Diệm of South Vietnam was led by Lieutenant Colonel Vương Văn Đông and Colonel Nguyễn Chánh Thi of the Airborne Division of the ARVN (ARVN). There was a further attempt to assassinate Diệm and his family in February 1962 when two air force officers—acting in unison—bombarded the Presidential Palace.

In 1962, the cornerstone of Diệm's counterinsurgency effort – the Strategic Hamlet Program (Vietnamese: Ấp Chiến lược), "the last and most ambitious of Diem's government's nation building schemes", was implemented, calling for the consolidation of 14,000 villages of South Vietnam into 11,000 secure hamlets, each with its own houses, schools, wells, and watchtowers supported by South Vietnamese government. The hamlets were intended to isolate the National Liberation Front (NLF) from the villages, their source for recruiting soldiers, supplies, and information, and to transform the countryside. In the end, because of many shortcomings, the Strategic Hamlet Program was not as successful as had been expected and was cancelled after the assassination of Diệm. However, according to Miller, the program created a remarkable turnabout in Diệm's regime in their war against communism. Frederick Nolting reported that Diệm named reestablishing control and security as his number one priority regarding the countryside. While appearing receptive to building an "infrastructure of democracy" in the rural areas, Diệm emphasised that it would have to wait until the conclusion of the war.

Religious policies and the Buddhist crisis

By most estimates, Buddhism was followed by 70–90% of the population, though some estimates place it lower, and Buddhism was followed alongside other traditions such as Vietnamese folk religion and Taoism. Diem was widely regarded by historians as having pursued pro-Catholic policies that antagonized many Buddhists. Specifically, the government was regarded as being biased towards Catholics in public service and military promotions, as well as the allocation of land, business favors, and tax concessions. Diệm allegedly once told a high-ranking officer, forgetting that he was a Buddhist, "Put your Catholic officers in sensitive places. They can be trusted." Many officers in the Army of the Republic of Vietnam converted to Catholicism in the belief that their military prospects depended on it. The distribution of weapons to village self-defense militias intended to repel Việt Cộng guerrillas saw weapons only given to Catholics. Some Buddhist villages converted en masse to Catholicism in order to receive aid or to avoid being forcibly resettled by Diệm's regime, with Buddhists in the army being denied promotion if they refused to convert to Catholicism. Some Catholic priests ran their own private armies, and in some areas forced conversions, looting, shelling, and demolition of pagodas occurred. Słowiak argues that Diem's favoritism towards Catholics was not a sign of corruption and nepotism, but that it was necessary for Diem to favor people loyal towards him, given the precarious internal situation of Vietnam.

The Catholic Church was the largest landowner in the country, and the "private" status imposed on Buddhism by the French required official permission to conduct public Buddhist activities and was never repealed by Diệm. Catholics were also de facto exempt from the corvée labor that the government obliged all citizens to perform; US aid was disproportionately distributed to Catholic-majority villages. The land owned by the Catholic Church was exempt from land reform. Under Diệm, the Catholic Church enjoyed special exemptions in property acquisition, and in 1959, Diệm dedicated his country to the Virgin Mary. The white and gold Vatican flag was regularly flown at all major public events in South Vietnam. The newly constructed Hue and Dalat universities were placed under Catholic authority to foster a Catholic-skewed academic environment. Nonetheless, Diệm had contributed to Buddhist communities in South Vietnam by giving them permission to carry out activities that were banned by French and supported money for Buddhist schools, ceremonies, and building more pagodas. Among the eighteen members of Diệm's cabinet, there were five Catholics, five Confucians, and eight Buddhists, including a vice-president and a foreign minister. Only three of the top nineteen military officials were Catholics.

The regime's relations with the United States worsened during 1963, as discontent among South Vietnam's Buddhist majority was simultaneously heightened. In May, in the heavily Buddhist central city of Huế—the seat of Diệm's elder brother as the local Catholic archbishop—the Buddhist majority was prohibited from displaying Buddhist flags during Vesak celebrations commemorating the birth of Gautama Buddha when the government cited a regulation prohibiting the display of non-government flags. A few days earlier, however, white and yellow Catholic papal flags flew at the 25th anniversary commemoration of Ngô Đình Thục's elevation to the rank of bishop. According to Miller, Diệm then proclaimed the flag embargo because he was annoyed with the commemoration for Thục. However, the ban on religious flags led to a protest led by Thích Trí Quang against the government, which was suppressed by Diệm's forces, and unarmed civilians were killed in the clash. Diệm and his supporters blamed the Việt Cộng for the deaths and claimed the protesters were responsible for the violence. Although the provincial chief expressed sorrow for the killings and offered to compensate the victims' families, they resolutely denied that government forces were responsible for the killings and blamed the Viet Cong. According to Diệm, it was the communists who threw a grenade into the crowd.

The Buddhists pushed for a five-point agreement: freedom to fly religious flags, an end to arbitrary arrests, compensation for the Huế victims, punishment for the officials responsible, and religious equality. Diệm then banned demonstrations and ordered his forces to arrest those who engaged in civil disobedience. On 3 June 1963, protesters attempted to march towards the Từ Đàm pagoda. Six waves of ARVN tear gas and attack dogs failed to disperse the crowds. Finally, brownish-red liquid chemicals were doused on praying protesters, resulting in 67 being hospitalized for chemical injuries. A curfew was subsequently enacted.

The turning point came in June when a Buddhist monk, Thích Quảng Đức, set himself on fire in the middle of a busy Saigon intersection in protest of Diệm's policies; photos of this event were disseminated around the world, and for many people these pictures came to represent the failure of Diệm's government. A number of other monks publicly self-immolated, and the US grew increasingly frustrated with the unpopular leader's public image in both Vietnam and the United States. Diệm used his conventional anti-communist argument, identifying the dissenters as communists. As demonstrations against his government continued throughout the summer, the special forces loyal to Diệm's brother, Nhu, conducted an August raid of the Xá Lợi pagoda in Saigon. Pagodas were vandalized, monks beaten, and the cremated remains of Quảng Đức, which included his heart, a religious relic, were confiscated. Simultaneous raids were carried out across the country, with the Từ Đàm pagoda in Huế looted, the statue of Gautama Buddha demolished, and the body of a deceased monk confiscated. When the populace came to the defense of the monks, the resulting clashes saw 30 civilians killed and 200 wounded. In all 1,400 monks were arrested, and some thirty were injured across the country. The United States indicated its disapproval of Diệm's administration when ambassador Henry Cabot Lodge Jr. visited the pagoda. No further mass Buddhist protests occurred during the remainder of Diệm's rule.

Madame Nhu Trần Lệ Xuân, Nhu's wife, inflamed the situation by mockingly applauding the suicides, stating, "If the Buddhists want to have another barbecue, I will be glad to supply the gasoline." The pagoda raids stoked widespread public disquiet in Saigon. Students at Saigon University boycotted classes and rioted, which led to arrests, imprisonments, and the closure of the university; this was repeated at Huế University. When high school students demonstrated, Diệm arrested them as well; over 1,000 students from Saigon's leading high school, most of them children of Saigon civil servants, were sent to re-education camps, including, reportedly, children as young as five, on charges of anti-government graffiti. Diệm's foreign minister Vũ Văn Mẫu resigned, shaving his head like a Buddhist monk in protest. When he attempted to leave the country on a religious pilgrimage to India, he was detained and kept under house arrest.

At the same time that the Buddhist crisis was taking place, a French diplomatic initiative to end the war had been launched. The initiative was known to historians as the "Maneli affair", after Mieczysław Maneli, the Polish Commissioner to the International Control Commission who served as an intermediary between the two Vietnams. In 1963, North Vietnam was suffering its worst drought in a generation. Maneli conveyed messages between Hanoi and Saigon negotiating a declaration of a ceasefire in exchange for South Vietnamese rice being traded for North Vietnamese coal. On 2 September 1963, Maneli met with Nhu at his office in the Gia Long Palace, a meeting that Nhu leaked to the American columnist Joseph Alsop, who revealed it to the world in his "A Matter of Fact" column in the Washington Post. Nhu's purpose in leaking the meeting was to blackmail the United States with the message that if Kennedy continued to criticize Diem's handling of the Buddhist crisis, Diem would reach an understanding with the Communists. The Kennedy administration reacted with fury at what Alsop had revealed. In a message to Secretary of State Dean Rusk, Roger Hilsman urged that a coup against Diem be encouraged to take place promptly, saying that the mere possibility that Diem might make a deal with the Communists meant that he had to go.

There have been many interpretations of the Buddhist crisis and the immolation of Thích Quảng Đức in 1963. Relating the events to the larger context of Vietnamese Buddhism in the 20th century and looking at the interactions between Diệm and Buddhist groups, the Buddhist protests during Diệm's regime were not only the struggles against discrimination in religious practices and religious freedom, but also the resistance of Vietnamese Buddhism to Diệm's nation-building policies centered by a personalist revolution that Buddhists considered a threat to the revival of Vietnamese Buddhist power. Until the end of his life, Diệm, along with his brother Nhu still believed that their nation-building was successful and they could resolve the Buddhist crisis in their own way, like what they had done with the Hinh crisis in 1954 and the struggle with the Bình Xuyên in 1955.

Jerema Słowiak of Jagiellonian University notes that the American media coverage skewed the true background of the conflict, spreading the "narrative of evil dictator Diệm oppressing good, peaceful Buddhists". Because of this, Diệm was considered a brutal and corrupt dictator in the United States at the time of his assassination. However, Diệm enjoyed relatively good relations with the Buddhists until 1963, and sponsored numerous Buddhist temples, especially Xá Lợi Pagoda in 1956. Vietnamese Buddhists had a nationalist vision for Vietnam of their own, and were political enemies of Diệm, engaged in "a clash of two competing visions of Vietnam". The Buddhist challenge to Diệm was politically motivated and constituted struggle for power rather than a religious conflict – the Buddhists protested mainly against the Ngo family and rejected Diệm's concessions, as their explicit goal was removal of Diệm. Thích Trí Quang, the leader of the Buddhist movement, insisted that the agitation must not stop until the South Vietnamese government is overthrown, and stated his intention to "call for suicide volunteers" if necessary. Edward Miller also argues that the primary cause of the protests was the opposition to Diệm and his agenda rather than the discriminatory policies, as the Buddhist movements of Vietnam had their own political goals that starkly contrasted with Diệm's. Diệm reacted to the Buddhist resistance the same way he reacted to the Sect Crisis of 1955, and Xá Lợi Pagoda raids successfully broke the protesters' movement. The military supported Diệm, and army leaders helped plan the raids and advocated for a forceful response to the protests, and only American disapproval drove military cliques to reconsider their support for Diệm.

Foreign policy

The foreign policy of the Republic of Vietnam (RVN), according to Fishel, "to a very considerable extent", was the policy of Ngo Dinh Diem himself during this period. He was the decisive factor in formulating foreign policies of the RVN, besides the roles of his adviser – Ngô Đình Nhu and his foreign ministers: Trần Văn Độ (1954–1955), Vũ Văn Mẫu (1955–1963) and Phạm Đăng Lâm (1963) who played subordinate roles in his regime. Nevertheless, since Diệm had to pay much attention to domestic issues in the context of the Vietnam War, foreign policy did not receive appropriate attention from him. Diệm paid more attention to countries that affected Vietnam directly and he seemed to personalize and emotionalize relations with other nations. The issues Diệm paid more attention in foreign affairs were: the Geneva Accords, the withdrawal of the French, international recognition, the cultivation of the legitimacy of the RVN and the relations with the United States, Laos (good official relations) and Cambodia (complicated relations, especially due to border disputes and minority ethnicities), and especially North Vietnam. Besides, the RVN also focused on diplomatic relations with other Asian countries to secure its international recognition.

Diệm's attitude toward India was not harmonious due to India's non-alignment policy, which Diệm assumed favored communism. It was not until in 1962, when India voted for a report criticizing the communists for supporting the invasion of South Vietnam, that Diệm eventually reviewed his opinions toward India. For Japan, Diệm's regime established diplomatic relations for the recognition of war reparations, which led to a reparation agreement in 1959 with the amount of $49 million. Diệm also established friendly relations with non-communist states, especially South Korea, Taiwan, the Philippines, Thailand, Laos and the Federation of Malaya, where Diệm's regime shared the common recognition of communist threats.

Regarding the relations with communist North Vietnam, Diệm maintained total hostility and never made a serious effort to establish any relations with it. In relations with France, as an anti-colonialism nationalist, Diệm did not believe in France and France was always a negative factor in his foreign policy. He also never "looked up on France as a counterweight to American influence".

Concerning relations with the US, although Diệm admitted the importance of the US-RVN alliance, he perceived that the US's assistance to the RVN was primarily serving its own national interest, rather than the RVN's national interest. Keith Taylor adds that Diệm's distrust of the US grew because of its Laotian policy, which gave North Vietnam access to South Vietnam's border through southern Laos. Diệm also feared the escalation of American military personnel in South Vietnam, which threatened his nationalist credentials and the independence of his government. In early 1963, the Ngô brothers even revised their alliance with the US. Moreover, they also disagreed with the US on how to best react to the threat from North Vietnam. While Diệm believed that before opening the political system for the participation of other political camps, military, and security matters should be taken into account; the US wanted otherwise and was critical of Diệm's clientelistic government, where political power based on his family members and trusted associates. The Buddhist crisis in South Vietnam decreased American confidence in Diệm, and eventually led to the coup d'état sanctioned by the US. Ultimately, nation-building politics "shaped the evolution and collapse of the US-Diem alliance". The different visions in the meanings of concepts – democracy, community, security, and social change – were substantial, and were a key cause of the strains throughout their alliance.

Coup and assassination

As the Buddhist crisis deepened in July 1963, non-communist Vietnamese nationalists and the military began preparations for a coup. Bùi Diễm, later South Vietnam's Ambassador to the United States, reported in his memoirs that General Lê Văn Kim requested his aid in learning what the United States might do about Diệm's government. Diễm had contacts in both the embassy and with the high-profile American journalists then in South Vietnam, David Halberstam (New York Times), Neil Sheehan (United Press International), and Malcolm Browne (Associated Press).

The coup d'état was designed by a military revolutionary council including ARVN generals led by General Dương Văn Minh. Lieutenant Colonel Lucien Conein, a CIA officer, had become a liaison between the US Embassy and the generals, who were led by Trần Văn Đôn. They met each other for the first time on 2 October 1963, at Tân Sơn Nhất airport. Three days later, Conein met with General Dương Văn Minh to discuss the coup and the stance of the US towards it. Conein then delivered the White House's message of American non-intervention, which was reiterated by Henry Cabot Lodge Jr., the U.S. ambassador, who gave secret assurances to the generals that the United States would not interfere.

The coup was chiefly planned by the Vietnamese generals. Unlike the coup in 1960, the plotters of the 1963 coup knew how to gain broad support from other ARVN officer corps. They obtained the support of Generals Tôn Thất Định, General Đỗ Cao Trí, General Nguyễn Khánh, the III, II Corps, and I Corps commanders. Only General Huỳnh Văn Cao of IV Corps remained loyal to Diệm.

On 1 November 1963, Conein donned his military uniform and stuffed three million Vietnamese piastres into a bag to be given to General Minh. Conein then called the CIA station and gave a signal indicating that the planned coup against President Diệm was about to start. Minh and his co-conspirators swiftly overthrew the government. With only the palace guard remaining to defend Diệm and his younger brother Nhu, the generals called the palace offering Diệm exile if he surrendered. That evening, however, Diệm and his entourage escaped via an underground passage to Cha Tam Catholic Church in Cholon, where they were captured the following morning. On 2 November 1963, the brothers were assassinated together in the back of an M113 armored personnel carrier with a bayonet and revolver by Captain Nguyễn Văn Nhung, under orders from Minh given while en route to the Vietnamese Joint General Staff headquarters. Diệm was buried in an unmarked grave in a cemetery next to the house of the US Ambassador.

Honours

National honours
:
 Grand Cross and Grand Master of the National Order of Vietnam

Foreign honours

:
 Honorary Recipient of the Order of the Crown of the Realm (D.M.N.(K)), 1960
:
	Grand Collar of the Order of Sikatuna, 13 October 1956
: 
 Grand Cross of the Royal Order of Cambodia
: 
 Order of Merit for National Foundation

 Order of Chula Chom Klao

 Knight Grand Cross of the Order of St. Michael and St. George, 1957

  Order of Brilliant Jade, 1960

Aftermath
Upon learning of Diệm's ouster and assassination, Hồ Chí Minh reportedly stated: "I can scarcely believe the Americans would be so stupid." The North Vietnamese Politburo was more explicit:

The consequences of the 1 November coup d'état will be contrary to the calculations of the US imperialists ... Diệm was one of the strongest individuals resisting the people and Communism. Everything that could be done in an attempt to crush the revolution was carried out by Diệm. Diệm was one of the most competent lackeys of the US imperialists  ... Among the anti-Communists in South Vietnam or exiled in other countries, no one has sufficient political assets and abilities to cause others to obey. Therefore, the lackey administration cannot be stabilized. The coup d'état on 1 November 1963 will not be the last.

After Diệm's assassination, South Vietnam was unable to establish a stable government and several coups took place after his death. While the United States continued to influence South Vietnam's government, the assassination bolstered North Vietnamese attempts to characterize the South Vietnamese as "supporters of colonialism".

Legacy
Diệm's assassination led to the collapse of his regime and to the end of the first Republic of Vietnam. Nevertheless, his contribution over his nine years of power from 1954 to 1963 can be appreciated at many levels by his part in resolving the northern refugees issue, establishing and consolidating the power of his regime, subduing the sects, and pacifying the country. Diệm stabilized an independent South Vietnam, which had suffered in the First Indochina War, and built a relatively stable government in Saigon in the late 1950s. The normality and domestic security created conditions for economic recovery and the development of education in South Vietnam, which contributed educated human resources to serve the nation.

According to Philip Catton, Diệm was first and foremost a Vietnamese nationalist who was wary of American dependence and "feared the Americans nearly as much as the Communist insurgents". Diệm constantly clashed with his American advisors over policies and had a completely different understanding of both democracy and Catholic values in comparison to the West. Keith Taylor argues that while Diệm's rule was authoritarian, it was also necessary given the precarious situation of the south. The South Vietnamese army would gradually gain experience and skill in both warfare and intelligence under Diệm's command, and his assassination turned the tide in favor of the north, with the consequent governments proving inefficient and incapable of organising successful resistance to Viet Cong advances. According to Edward Miller, Diệm was greatly autonomous from the United States and that Diệm was neither an outstandingly authoritarian nor excessively corrupt leader, questioning the notion that Diệm's main agenda was to increase his family's power.

References

Sources

 
 Cao, Văn Luận (1972). Bên giòng lịch sử, 1940–1965. Trí Dũng, Sài Gòn.
 
 
 
 
 

 
 Kolko, Gabriel (1987). Vietnam: Anatomy of a War, 1940–1975. Unwin Paperbacks.

 
 
 Morgan, Joseph (1997). The Vietnam Lobby: The American friends of Vietnam 1955–1975. University of North Carolina Press.
 
 
 
 
 Taylor, K. W., ed. (2015). Voices from the Second Republic of South Vietnam (1967–1975). Ithaca, NY: Southeast Asia Program Publications, Cornell University Press.

Further reading

 
 
 
 
 
 
 Keith, Charles (2012). Catholic Vietnam: A Church from Empire to Nation. University of California Press.
 
 Lockhart, Bruce McFarland, Bruce McFarland (1993). The end of the Vietnamese monarchy. Council on Southeast Asia Studies, Yale Center for International and Area Studies.
 
 
 Morgan, Joseph (2003). "Wesley Fishel and Vietnam: A special kind of Friend" in The Human Tradition in American since 1945 ed. David Anderson, Wilmington.
 
 Oberdorfer, Don (2003). Senator Mansfiled: the Extraordinary Life of a Great American Statesman and Diplomat. Washington, DC
 
 
 
 
 
 Trần, Mỹ-Vân (2005). A Vietnamese Royal Exile in Japan: Prince Cường Để (1882–1951). Routledge.

External links

 JFK and the Diem Coup – Provided by the National Security Archive.
 The Pentagon Papers, Vol. 2 Ch. 4  "The Overthrow of Ngo Dinh Diem, May–November, 1963", pp. 201–76

 
1901 births
1963 deaths
People from Quảng Bình province
Ngo family
Vietnamese Roman Catholics
South Vietnamese politicians
Heads of state of South Vietnam
Presidents of Vietnam
Buddhist crisis
Catholic Church in Vietnam
Nguyen dynasty officials
South Vietnam
Vietnamese anti-communists
Vietnamese Confucianists
Vietnamese nationalists
20th-century executions of Vietnamese people
Persecution of Buddhists
Vietnamese people of the Vietnam War
Michigan State University people
Leaders ousted by a coup
1960s murders in Vietnam
1963 crimes in Vietnam
1963 murders in Asia
People executed by South Vietnam
People executed by Vietnam by firearm
Executed presidents
People murdered in Vietnam
Assassinated heads of state
Assassinated Vietnamese politicians
Burials at Mac Dinh Chi Cemetery
Vietnamese independence activists
Politicide perpetrators
People of the Cold War
People killed in Central Intelligence Agency operations
Recipients of the National Order of Vietnam
Order of Civil Merit members
Recipients of the Order of Merit for National Foundation